The Benjamin–Bona–Mahony equation (BBM equation, also regularized long-wave equation; RLWE) is the partial differential equation

They show the stability and uniqueness of solutions to the BBM equation. This contrasts with the KdV equation, which is unstable in its high wavenumber components. Further, while the KdV equation has an infinite number of integrals of motion, the BBM equation only has three.

Before, in 1966, this equation was introduced by Peregrine, in the study of undular bores.

A generalized n-dimensional version is given by

Solitary wave solution

The BBM equation possesses solitary wave solutions of the form:

For , the solitary waves have a positive crest elevation and travel in the positive -direction with velocity  These solitary waves are not solitons, i.e. after interaction with other solitary waves, an oscillatory tail is generated and the solitary waves have changed.

Hamiltonian structure
The BBM equation has a Hamiltonian structure, as it can be written as:

 with Hamiltonian  and operator  

Conservation laws
The BBM equation possesses exactly three independent and non-trivial conservation laws.

The three conservation laws then are:

Linear dispersion
The linearized version of the BBM equation is:

Periodic progressive wave solutions are of the form:

with  the wavenumber and  the angular frequency. The dispersion relation of the linearized BBM equation is

Similarly, for the linearized KdV equation  the dispersion relation is:

This is in contrast with its purpose as an approximation for uni-directional waves propagating in the positive -direction.

The strong growth of frequency  and phase speed with wavenumber  posed problems in the numerical solution of the KdV equation, while the BBM equation does not have these shortcomings.

Notes

References 

 (Warning: On p. 174 Zwillinger misstates the Benjamin–Bona–Mahony equation, confusing it with the similar KdV equation.)

Partial differential equations
Equations of fluid dynamics